Home in Halifax is a 1993 live album by Stan Rogers. It was recorded by the CBC during a concert Rogers performed at the Rebecca Cohn Auditorium in Halifax, Nova Scotia in March 1982, 11 years prior. The concert was put together as a live radio and T.V. broadcast celebrating Rogers' annual appearance at the Cohn. The stage was decorated with a ship's mast, wheels, lobster traps and fishing nets.

A release the previous year, titled "In Concert" and released on CBC's "Variety Recordings" label, featured a different track listing of material from the same concert.

Track listing
Bluenose
Make & Break Harbour
Field Behind The Plow
Shriner Cows (dialogue)
Night Guard
Morris Dancers (dialogue)
The Idiot
Lies
Free In The Harbour
Band Introductions (dialogue)
Workin' Joe
The Legend Of Fingal (dialogue)
Giant
45 Years
Mary Ellen Carter Intro (dialogue)
The Mary Ellen Carter
Barrett's Privateers
Sailor's Rest Intro (dialogue)
Sailor's Rest

In Concert Release (1991)
The Witch Of The Westmorland	4:41
The Field Behind The Plough	4:23
Night Guard	3:08
Forty-Five Years	3:34
The Idiot	2:49
Lies	5:37
Working Joe	3:40
Free In The Harbour	3:55
Dark-Eyed Molly	3:55
Sailors' Rest	5:35
The Mary Ellen Carter	5:14

Musicians
Stan Rogers (6-string, 12-string guitars)
Garnet Rogers (Fiddle, Electric guitar)
Jim Morison (Bass)
Paul Mills (6-string guitar)

References

Stan Rogers albums
Live albums published posthumously
1993 live albums